Wycoff may refer to:

People
Leon Ames (1902–1993), born Leon Wycoff, American film and television actor
Corrina Wycoff (fl. 2007–2016), American writer
Doug Wycoff (1903–1981), American football player
Michael Wycoff (born 1956), American R&B singer

Places
Wykoff, Minnesota, a city in Minnesota, U.S.

See also
Wyckoff (disambiguation)
Wyckoff School District

Disambiguation pages with surname-holder lists